Under the Green Star is a science fantasy novel by American writer Lin Carter.  Published  by DAW Books in 1972, it is the first novel in his Green Star Series.

The story (and the entire series) is told from the point of an unnamed first-person narrator who is 30 years old, very wealthy but crippled, and who knows some eastern arts including soul casting.

Plot summary
One night the narrator sees a green star in the night sky, and casts his soul towards it.  He finds a cloud-covered planet which revolves around it and sees that its surface is covered with trees that (from his perspective) seem several miles high.  Later, he follows a retinue of humans riding on horse-sized (based on humans retaining earthly size, as he explains at one later point in the novel and another later in the series) dragonflies (which he finds out later are known as ) to a splendid city which sparkles like a jewel collection.  One of the men in the retinue, cruel-faced and clad in bright yellow, presents a proposal (which the author cannot yet hear) to the ruler of the city, a princess who looks about 14.

At that point, the author is drawn to a large man's body preserved inside a casket—which he revives to the consternation of the yellow retinue, and the cheers of the jewel-city's nobles.

As he has taken the body of a man preserved for over a hundred years (whose soul was banished by a sorcerer), the author has to "relearn" Laonese, the universal language of the planet; he learns that the Jewel-city is known as Phaolon, considered the most splendid city on the planet; that its beautiful ruler is princess Niamh the Fair; that the yellow-clad man was Akhmim ruler of the rival city of Ardha (also known as "yellow city").  He is also "brought up to speed" (the body he took was that of a warrior named Chong The Mighty) on swords, bows, and other weapons.

As they escape from it, Niamh is drawn to a flower, which turns out to be a vampire species—but before it can kill her and Chong, the two are rescued by a band of outlaws.

The outlaw band is led by a female, Siona, who falls in (unrequited, as he loves Niamh) love with Chong.  Chong makes friends with one of the rescuers, Yurgon—but an enemy of another of the band, weasel-faced Sligon (who manages to find out about the secret of Niamh and Chong).

Later, Sligon reveals the secret to Siona (whose father was banished by Niamh's) and strikes Chong with a poisoned dagger—only to be immediately slain by Siona.  Chong aids Niamh in getting to the  pens (to escape) prior to succumbing to the wound and poison—at which point the narrator (on earth) regains consciousness.

Under the Green Star was followed a year later by When the Green Star Calls.

Reception
Lester del Rey reported that Carter's writing here had more of the virtues of Edgar Rice Burroughs's adventure stories than other novels where Carter attempted to imitate Burroughs.

References

External links 

1972 American novels
Novels by Lin Carter
1972 science fiction novels
1972 fantasy novels
American fantasy novels
DAW Books books